Kevin Carroll may refer to:

 Kevin Carroll (actor), American actor
 Kevin Carroll (politician), British politician, chairman of the now defunct British Freedom Party
 Kevin Carroll (prosthetist), Irish prosthetist, researcher, educator, and author
 Kevin Carroll (gridiron football) (born 1969), American football defensive lineman